The 2012 Bet-at-home Cup Kitzbühel Doubles was a men's tennis tournament played on outdoor clay courts in Kitzbühel, Austria.

Daniele Bracciali and Santiago González were the defending champions but decided not to participate.

Seeds

Draw

Draw

References
 Main Draw

Bet-at-home Cup Kitzbuhel - Doubles
2012 Doubles